Bhadrakali High School, Gokarna is one of the oldest high schools in Kumta taluk, Uttar Kannada district, India. Bhadrkali is the name of the Hindu Goddess  Kali. The school is named after the Goddess Kali.

The school was founded in 1946  by D. V. Kamat Kimanikar and S. R. Nadkarni. D. V. Kamat laid the foundation stone of the school.

Former headmasters 
 Murthy from Shivamogga
 Hiregange from Gokarna
 Ramesh V. Naik from Hanehalli

Notable teacher 
 Gourish Kaikini

Notable alumni 
 Narayan Hosmane
 Ramachandra S. Hosmane
 Jayant Kaikini

References 

Schools in Uttara Kannada district
High schools and secondary schools in Karnataka
Educational institutions established in 1946
1946 establishments in India